Neumarkt (German for "new market") may refer to several places:

Austria
 Neumarkt am Wallersee, in Salzburg
 , in the Jennersdorf District, Burgenland
 Neumarkt an der Ybbs, in Lower Austria
 Neumarkt im Hausruckkreis, in the Hausruckviertel, Upper Austria
 Neumarkt im Mühlkreis, in the Mühlviertel, Upper Austria
 Neumarkt in Steiermark, in Styria

Czech Republic
 Neumarkt, the German name of Úterý in Plzeň

Germany
 Cologne Neumarkt, location of the Neumarkt station, one of the major squares in Cologne, North Rhine-Westphalia
 Dresden Neumarkt, a historically important square in Dresden, Saxony
 Neumarkt (district), in Bavaria
 Neumarkt in der Oberpfalz, in Bavaria
 Neumarkt-Sankt Veit, in Bavaria

Italy
 Neumarkt, South Tyrol, a municipality in South Tyrol

Poland
 Neumarkt am Dohnst, the German name of Nowy Targ in Lesser Poland
 Neumarkt in Schlesien, the German name of Środa Śląska in Lower Silesia

Romania
 Neumarkt am Mieresch, the German name of Târgu Mureș

Switzerland
 Neumarkt, Zürich, an area and street in Zürich
 Theater am Neumarkt, situated in Zürich

See also 
 Nieuwmarkt, a square in the centre of Amsterdam
 Newmarket (disambiguation) and New Market (disambiguation)